Denys Kostyuk (born 13 March 1982) is a Ukrainian former professional road bicycle racer, who rode professionally between 2004 and 2016. During his career, Kostyuk rode for UCI ProTeam  in 2011 and 2012, and competed in the 2011 Tour de France where he finished in 153rd place.

Personal life
He is married to triple jumper Olha Saladukha.

Major results

2002
 4th Gran Premio Industrie del Marmo
2003
 1st Gran Premio Palio del Recioto
 2nd Overall Giro delle Regioni
1st Stages 4 & 5 (ITT)
 2nd Gran Premio Industrie del Marmo
 2nd Giro del Belvedere
 2nd Gran Premio della Liberazione
 3rd Trofeo Banca Popolare di Vicenza
 3rd Trofeo Alcide Degasperi
 4th Giro del Mendrisiotto
2004
 3rd Road race, National Road Championships
 8th Druivenkoers Overijse
2005
 5th Overall Tour de l'Avenir
 9th Overall Tour of Belgium
2006
 1st Stage 3 Tour of Qinghai Lake
 2nd Overall Five Rings of Moscow
 3rd Road race, National Road Championships
 7th Overall Grand Prix of Sochi
 10th Overall Bałtyk–Karkonosze Tour
1st Stage 5
 10th Mayor Cup
2007
 7th Overall Tour of Qinghai Lake
2008
 National Road Championships
2nd Road race
3rd Time trial
 2nd Overall Course de Solidarność et des Champions Olympiques
 3rd Overall Flèche du Sud
1st Stage 3
 5th Sparkassen Giro Bochum
 6th Overall Grand Prix of Sochi
 6th Neuseen Classics
 8th La Roue Tourangelle
2009
 4th Tro-Bro Léon
 9th Overall Tour of Ireland
 10th Overall Volta ao Alentejo
2010
 7th Grand Prix de Fourmies
2013
 1st  Road race, National Road Championships
 1st Race Horizon Park 1
 2nd Overall Five Rings of Moscow
 7th Memorial Oleg Dyachenko
2014
 1st Race Horizon Park 3
 2nd Road race, National Road Championships
2015
 2nd Road race, National Road Championships
 2nd Moscow Cup
 2nd Race Horizon Park Race for Peace
 5th Overall Tour of Mersin
 6th Grand Prix of ISD
 6th Odessa Grand Prix 2
2016
 3rd Road race, National Road Championships

References

External links

Ukrainian male cyclists
1982 births
Living people
People from Pervomaisk, Mykolaiv Oblast
European Games competitors for Ukraine
Cyclists at the 2015 European Games
Cyclists at the 2016 Summer Olympics
Olympic cyclists of Ukraine
Sportspeople from Mykolaiv Oblast